ICS SP ls a civil society organization.

History
ICS Africa was founded in 1980 and aimed to ensure the safety and wellbeing of all children in Africa.

2004: Name and Headquarter Change
ICS moves its headquarters to Nunspeet in 2004, also changing its name from "International Christian Support Fund" to "International Child Support". The word 'Christian' implied that ICS only supported Christians, conflicting with ICS' goal of supporting underprivileged people regardless of belief.

2011: Name and Logo Change
ICS changes their logo and its name to "Investing in Children and their Societies" (ICS SP).

Projects
 Nafics - Nafics Ltd is a maize trading company in Kenya. It aims to turn a profit while supporting the Western Kenyan maize supply chain, specifically in Busia and Kakamega.
 Skillful Parenting Project (Africa)  - ICS SP works with parents with the aim of preventing child abuse, neglect, and family disintegration.
 Agribusiness (Kenya) - ICS SP provides farm inputs on the condition of reforms to ensure timely planting, use of modern farming technologies, and increased harvest. The agribusiness project is part of the ISEC (Investing in Social and Economic Change) program in Western Kenya, which aims to improve income and food security for households.
 Agribusiness (Tanzania)  - ICS implements a similar agribusiness program in Meatu, Tanzania to boost cereal and sunflower production.
 Young Entrepreneurs Program (Y.E.P.)   - ICS SP intends promotes self-employment in Meatu, Tanzania through an ICS Academy, training youth in agriculture, ICT, or mechanics, as well as providing entrepreneurship development programs.
 Water Project - ICS SP aims to combat severe water scarcity in Meatu, Tanzania.

Location

ICS SP Nairobi 
The ICS SP Headquarters are located at Westland, between Park Inn by Radisson and KESRA Building  in Nairobi, Kenya

References

Development charities based in the Netherlands
Foreign charities operating in Kenya